is a Japanese former professional baseball pitcher in Japan's Nippon Professional Baseball. He played for the Hanshin Tigers in 2007 and from 2009 to 2015.

External links

NPB stats

1985 births
Living people
Baseball people from Osaka Prefecture
People from Suita
Japanese baseball players
Hanshin Tigers players